Song Linshu (born July 9, 1997) is a Chinese ice dancer.  With her former skating partner, Sun Zhuoming, she is the 2018 Chinese national silver medalist. They competed twice at the Four Continents Championships and at 2016 Cup of China.

Programs

With Sun

With Liu

Competitive highlights 
GP: Grand Prix; JGP: Junior Grand Prix.

With Sun

With Liu

References

External links 
 
 

1997 births
Living people
Chinese female ice dancers
Figure skaters from Changchun
Competitors at the 2015 Winter Universiade